Atkins is a city in Benton County, Iowa, United States. The population was 2,056 at the 2020 census. It is part of the Cedar Rapids Metropolitan Statistical Area.

History
Atkins was founded in 1881, following construction of the Chicago, Milwaukee and St. Paul Railroad through the territory. It was named for a railroad official.

Geography
Atkins is located approximately 10 miles (16 km) west of downtown Cedar Rapids.

Demographics

2010 census
As of the census of 2010, there were 1,670 people, 592 households, and 480 families living in the city. The racial makeup of the city was 98.9% White, 0.1% African American, 0.3% Native American, 0.1% Asian, and 0.7% from two or more races. Hispanic or Latino of any race were 0.7% of the population.

There were 592 households, of which 45.6% had children under the age of 18 living with them, 72.8% were married couples living together, 4.1% had a female householder with no husband present, 4.2% had a male householder with no wife present, and 18.9% were non-families. 14.7% of all households were made up of individuals, and 6% had someone living alone who was 65 years of age or older. The average household size was 2.82 and the average family size was 3.14.

The median age in the city was 35.7 years. 31.3% of residents were under the age of 18; 5% were between the ages of 18 and 24; 30.5% were from 25 to 44; 23.1% were from 45 to 64; and 9.9% were 65 years of age or older. The gender makeup of the city was 51.0% male and 49.0% female.

2000 census
As of the census of 2000, there were 977 people, 361 households, and 275 families living in the city. The racial makeup of the city was 99.69% White, 0.10% Native American, and 0.20% from two or more races. Hispanic or Latino of any race were 0.82% of the population.

There were 361 households, out of which 42.4% had children under the age of 18 living with them, 68.1% were married couples living together, 5.3% had a female householder with no husband present, and 23.8% were non-families. 20.8% of all households were made up of individuals, and 8.3% had someone living alone who was 65 years of age or older. The average household size was 2.71 and the average family size was 3.13.

31.3% were under the age of 18, 5.7% from 18 to 24, 34.2% from 25 to 44, 17.7% from 45 to 64, and 11.1% were 65 years of age or older. The median age was 33 years. For every 100 females, there were 102.7 males. For every 100 females age 18 and over, there were 101.5 males.

The median income for a household in the city was $50,833, and the median income for a family was $58,375. Males had a median income of $40,950 versus $26,719 for females. The per capita income for the city was $20,507. About 1.7% of families and 3.9% of the population were below the poverty line, including 6.0% of those under age 18 and 3.4% of those age 65 or over.

Education
Benton Community School District operates local public schools.

References

External links
 Official City Website

Cities in Benton County, Iowa
Cities in Iowa
Cedar Rapids, Iowa metropolitan area
1881 establishments in Iowa